EchoStar II is a communications satellite operated by EchoStar. Launched in 1996 it was operated in geostationary orbit at a longitude of 148 degrees west for 12 or 15 years.

Satellite 
The launch of EchoStar I made use of an Ariane 4 rocket flying from Guiana Space Centre in Kourou, French Guiana. The launch took place at 00:59 UTC on September 11, 1996, with the spacecraft entering a geosynchronous transfer orbit. The spacecraft carried 16 Ku band transponders to enable direct broadcast communications and television channels through  dishes on the ground in the Contiguous United States.

From September 1996 to November 2001, it was at position 118.8° W, while from December 2001 until July 2008, it was at position 148° W. The satellite ended its activities on July 14, 2008.

Specifications 
 Launch mass: 
 Power source: 2 deployable solar arrays, batteries
 Stabilization: 3-axis
 Propulsion: 2 × LEROS-1B

See also

 1996 in spaceflight

References

Spacecraft launched in 1996
Communications satellites in geostationary orbit
E02